Khawto (English:Wound) is a 2016 Bengali erotic romantic thriller film directed by Kamaleshwar Mukherjee under the banner of Shree Venkatesh Films. The Film stars Prosenjit Chatterjee, Paoli Dam and Raima Sen in lead roles. The film was premiered on 21 July 2016 in Kolkata. The film met with positive reviews upon release.

Plot
Lovebirds Sohag (Tridha Choudhury) and Rishav (Ronodeep Bose) cross roads with celebrated writer Nirbed Lahiri (Prosenjit Chatterjee) during a vacation to Koelphuli. In his isolated cottage, Nirbed, who had isolated himself from society two decades, narrates his tale of lust and misadventures to the young couple.

Cast
 Prosenjit Chatterjee as Nirbed Lahiri / Dhrubo
 Paoli Dam as Damayanti Chkaraborty / Antara 
 Raima Sen as Srijita /Sri
 Tridha Choudhury as Sohaag 
 Ronodeep Bose as Rishav
 Rahul Banerjee as Alokesh
 Mishka Halim as Bishakha 
 Ushashie Chakraborty as Madhushree
 Padmanabha Dasgupta
 Aloke Mukherjee

Soundtrack
This film's soundtrack composed by Anupam Roy.

References

2016 films
Bengali-language Indian films
2010s Bengali-language films
Indian romantic thriller films
Films scored by Anupam Roy
Indian erotic thriller films
2010s erotic thriller films
Films directed by Kamaleshwar Mukherjee
2010s romantic thriller films